The Julia Fordham Collection is the first compilation album by English singer-songwriter Julia Fordham, released in 1998. It covers ten years of Fordham's career, from her 1988 debut album up to the release of the compilation.

Content
The compilation includes selected singles and album tracks from Fordham's first five studio albums: Julia Fordham (1988), Porcelain (1989), Swept (1991), Falling Forward (1994) and East West (1997). Three of the album's tracks are reworked versions, including "Where Does the Time Go? ('98 Version)", which features American singer Curtis Stigers on vocals. Also included are two previously unreleased tracks: "Kid", a newly recorded song for this compilation, and "It Was Nothing That You Said", which was recorded during the East West sessions but not included on the final track listing of that album.

Track listing
All tracks written by Julia Fordham, except where noted.
"Happy Ever After" (Rain Forest Mix '98) – original version from Julia Fordham
"Where Does the Time Go?" ('98 Version, featuring Curtis Stigers) – original version from Julia Fordham
"Manhattan Skyline" – from the US version of Porcelain
"Lock & Key" – from Porcelain
"Porcelain" – from Porcelain
"Girlfriend" – from Porcelain
"Falling Forward" (Fordham, John Watkin) – from Falling Forward
"I Can't Help Myself" – from Falling Forward
"I Thought It Was You" ('98 Mix) – original version from Swept
"East West" – from East West
"Killing Me Slowly" – from East West
"Kid" – previously unreleased
"It Was Nothing That You Said" – previously unreleased
"(Love Moves in) Mysterious Ways" (Dean Pitchford, Tom Snow) – from Swept
"Happy Ever After" (Original Mix) – from Julia Fordham

References

External links
The Julia Fordham Collection at Discogs

1998 greatest hits albums
Virgin Records compilation albums
Julia Fordham albums
Albums produced by Hugh Padgham
Albums produced by Larry Klein
Albums produced by Peter Asher